Stratocumulus floccus is a species of cloud belonging to Stratocumulus cloud genus. Stratocumulus floccus is usually a sign of instability at that altitude. This cloud is usually formed due to the remaining dissipation of a stratocumulus castellanus cloud base.

References 

Cumulus
Clouds
Atmospheric sciences